Henry Frost (August 17, 1914 — March 28, 1973) was a Canadian professional ice hockey forward who played two regular games and one playoff game in the National Hockey League for the Boston Bruins during the 1938–39 season. Boston won the Stanley Cup that year, and added Frost's name on the Cup. The rest of Frost's career, which lasted from 1935 to 1952, was spent in different minor leagues. He was born in Kerr Lake, Ontario, but grew up in New Liskeard, Ontario.

Career statistics

Regular season and playoffs

External links

Harry Frost at the homepage for the Louisville Blades

1914 births
1973 deaths
Boston Bruins players
Canadian expatriate ice hockey players in the United States
Canadian ice hockey forwards
Fort Worth Rangers players
Fresno Falcons players
Hershey Bears players
Ice hockey people from Ontario
Louisville Blades players
People from Temiskaming Shores
Philadelphia Rockets players
St. Louis Flyers players
Stanley Cup champions
Washington Lions players